Naples is an incorporated town in Scott County in the U.S. state of Illinois. The population was 130 at the 2010 census. It is part of the Jacksonville Micropolitan Statistical Area.

History
The Potawatomi Trail of Death passed through here in 1838.

Geography
Naples is located at  (39.753973, -90.608111).

Demographics

As of the census of 2000, there were 134 people, 45 households, and 32 families residing in the town. The racial makeup of the town was 98.51% White, 0.75% Native American, 0.75% from other races. Hispanic or Latino of any race were 4.48% of the population.

There were 45 households, out of which 51.1% had children under the age of 18 living with them, 46.7% were married couples living together, 17.8% had a female householder with no husband present, and 26.7% were non-families. 17.8% of all households were made up of individuals, and 4.4% had someone living alone who was 65 years of age or older. The average household size was 2.98 and the average family size was 3.27.

In the town, the population was spread out, with 34.3% under the age of 18, 10.4% from 18 to 24, 33.6% from 25 to 44, 19.4% from 45 to 64, and 2.2% who were 65 years of age or older. The median age was 30 years. For every 100 females, there were 94.2 males. For every 100 females age 18 and over, there were 104.7 males.

The median income for a household in the town was $27,083, and the median income for a family was $26,667. Males had a median income of $42,500 versus $19,500 for females. The per capita income for the town was $10,719. There were 26.7% of families and 29.3% of the population living below the poverty line, including 35.1% of under eighteens and none of those over 64.

References

1839 establishments in Illinois
Jacksonville, Illinois micropolitan area
Populated places established in 1839
Towns in Scott County, Illinois
Towns in Illinois